505 (DV) is a year in the Gregorian calendar (A.D.; Anno Domini; CE; Common Era).

505 may also refer to:

 505 (dinghy), a sailboat class
 505 Games, a European video game publisher
 505 (Nashville), a skyscraper in Nashville, Tennessee, US
 505 (number)
 "505", a song by Arctic Monkeys from Favourite Worst Nightmare
 Area code 505 in northwest New Mexico
 Indy 505, the 1995 edition of the Indianapolis 500
 Peugeot 505, a car
 Roland TR-505 Rhythm Composer, 1986 drum machine and MIDI sequencer

See also

 
 500 (disambiguation)
 100 (disambiguation)
 5 (disambiguation)
 DV (disambiguation)